Barbourfields Stadium is a  multi-purpose stadium in Bulawayo, Zimbabwe, home to Highlanders FC. It is currently used mostly for football matches. It is owned by Bulawayo City Council and is home to Highlanders F.C., one of the biggest soccer teams in Zimbabwe. Soccer fans commonly refer to the stadium as "Emagumeni" meaning "our yard" in iSiNdebele. As of 2017, Barbourfields Stadium may be used as homeground to other football teams in and around Bulawayo including Bantu Rovers FC, How Mine FC and Chicken Inn FC, but mostly, when they play big teams. The stadium consists of four stands including the most famous ones; the Mpilo End (usually for the away fans), and, of course, the Soweto End (for the 'die hard' home fans). It has a capacity of 25,000 making it the second largest stadium in Zimbabwe after the National Sports Stadium (60,000).

Highlanders F.C. drew the highest average home attendance in their domestic league in 2016, with an average attendance of 5,614. The previous year, they drew an average home attendance of 7,276 for domestic league games.

References

Football venues in Zimbabwe
Buildings and structures in Bulawayo
Stadiums in Zimbabwe
Multi-purpose stadiums in Zimbabwe
Sport in Bulawayo
Highlanders F.C.